The 25th Infantry Brigade / Siwah or 25th Raiser Infantry Brigade / Siwah is an organic Indonesian Army Brigade under the Kodam Iskandar Muda. It is in charge of 3 Infantry Battalions: 111st Raider infantry Battalion / Karma Bhakti, 113rd Raider Infantry Battalion / Jaya Sakti and 114th Raider Infantry battalion/ Satria Musara). These units were previously under 011th Military Resort Command/Lilawangsa. It is led by Commander Maj. Gen. Moch. Fachrudin S. Sos who was assigned the post on Thursday, December 28, 2017.

Organic Battalions 
This brigade consists of 3 Infantry Battalions:
 111st Raider Infantry Battalion/Karma Bhakti in Tualang Cut, Aceh Tamiang.
 113th Raider Infantry Battalion/Jaya Sakti in July, Bireun.
 114th Raider Infantry Battalion/Satria Musara in Reumbele, Bener Meriah.

Commander 
 Colonel Inf Asep Sukarna (December 28, 2017 -)

References

External links 
 

Army units and formations of Indonesia
Military units and formations of Indonesia
02
Aceh
Sumatra
Military units and formations established in 2017